Mussa may refer to:

People 
Aisha Mohammed Mussa, Ethiopian engineer and politician
Ali Mussa Daqduq (21st century), Hezbollah explosives expert
Abu Imran Mussa bin Maimun ibn Abdallah al-Qurtubi al-Israili (1135–1204), rabbi, physician, and philosopher
Haji Mussa Kitole (21st century), Zanzibari politician
Meryce Mussa Emmanuel (21st century), Tanzanian politician
Mohammed Mussa Yakubi (21st century), Afghan extrajudicial prisoner of the United States
Omar Mussa (footballer, born 1980), Burundian footballer
Omar Mussa (footballer, born 2000), Belgian footballer

Places 
Mussa, Tanzania, a ward in Arusha District Council

Biology 
Mussa (genus), a stony coral genus